Computational methods that use protein sequence and/ or protein structure to predict protein aggregation. The table below, shows the main features of software for prediction of protein aggregation

Table

See also 
PhasAGE toolbox

Amyloid

Protein aggregation

References 

Protein structure
Structural bioinformatics software
Proteomics
Neurodegenerative disorders